= Josephine Adhet Deng =

South Sudanese lawyer (born 1996)

- Born: 1996 (age 29–30)
- Occupation: lawyer
- Known for: women's rights
- Spouse: Faustino Atem Gualdit
- Children: two

Maulana Josephine Adhet Deng (born 1996) is a leading South Sudanese campaigning lawyer for women's rights. She was a child-bride and she is the estranged wife of a member of parliament.

== Life ==
Deng was born in about 1996 and by the age of eight she was married. She was married to Faustino Atem Gualdit who was a leader during the civil war.

Her husband became a member of the South Sudanese parliament. They had separated in 2022 and Deng obtained a court order that required him to give her access to their two children. He is alleged to have beaten Deng at parliament with other parliamentarians as witnesses.

In January 2024 she was one of the advocates and members of the bar who were chosen to ensure a fair election because they were trusted by the members. They group will convene a general assembly of the membership where the leadership of the bar organisation will be decided.

In May 2024 she began an investigation into a woman who died by electrocution. The case has links to the President Salva Kiir and Deng says that she has been threatened to drop the case.

In 2024 she became involved in a high-profile case of an alleged under-age marriage auction. The case involves a bride who was said to have been auctioned for a record amount. Two powerful men had bid to take the girl as their bride. The marriage was witnessed by a large number of notable people at a traditional ceremony called an akam that happens at the end of these traditional bride auctions. The age of the girl is in dispute, but several people believe she is fourteen and her consent to the marriage is in doubt. Deng has taken the girl's father to court for allowing the under-age marriage and to require that the bride is returned to South Sudan.
